The Scottish American Investment Company is a publicly traded investment trust. It invests in a broad range of UK and international assets. The Scottish American Investment Company is managed by Baillie Gifford & Co Limited, the Edinburgh-based investment management partnership. It is listed on the London Stock Exchange and is a constituent of the FTSE 250 Index.

History
SAINTS was initially formed as The Scottish American Investment Company Limited by William Menzies in March 1873. Menzies was an Edinburgh lawyer who had visited the United States on several occasions during the 1860s and was struck during those visits by the wealth of investment opportunities in that young and rapidly growing nation. Among the other co-founders were Scottish emigrant American banker John Stewart Kennedy and Dundee and later London financier Robert Fleming.

As well as adapting its investment portfolio to changing conditions, the Company has also had to be flexible in how it conducts its affairs. Until 1970, the Company managed its investments itself but this changed in 1970 when Stewart Fund Managers Limited was appointed to manage SAINTS. Stewart Fund Managers and various successor companies acted as SAINTS' manager from that point until 31 December 2003 when management of the portfolio passed to Baillie Gifford & Co Limited.

Historical investments
Scottish American Investment's subsidiary, "Scottish-American Mortgage Company," financed the well-known Swan Land and Cattle Co. and Prairie Land and Cattle Co., as well as the El Capote Ranch.

References

External links
The Scottish American Investment Company Website
Baillie Gifford & Co Website
Trust Magazine - Investment trust news, expert analysis, videos, competitions, and more from Baillie Gifford

Investment trusts of the United Kingdom
British companies established in 1873
Companies listed on the London Stock Exchange
Investment management companies of the United Kingdom
Companies based in Edinburgh
1873 establishments in Scotland
Financial services companies established in 1873